In shogi, the Saginomiya joseki (鷺宮定跡 saginomiya jōseki) is a joseki for a Left Silver-5g Rapid Attack (Static Rook) vs Fourth File Rook (Ranging  Rook) opening. It was originally conceived by Teruichi Aono between 1975 and 1985, and further popularized in title matches by Kunio Yonenaga. The name Saginomiya comes from the fact that both Aono and Yonenaga lived in the Saginomiya District of Nakano in Tokyo.

See also

 Yamada joseki
 Left Silver-57 Rapid Attack
 Fourth File Rook
 Static Rook

Bibliography

External links

 YouTube: HIDETCHI's Shogi Openings:
 Saginomiya Jouseki #1
 Saginomiya Jouseki #2
 Saginomiya Jouseki #3
 Saginomiya Jouseki #4 (New Saginomiya)
 Saginomiya Jouseki #5 (New Saginomiya)
 Saginomiya Jouseki #6 (New Saginomiya)
 Saginomiya Jouseki #7 (Summary)
 Shogi in English: Static Rook vs 4th-file Rook: Saginomiya Opening Theory

Shogi openings
Static Rook vs Ranging Rook openings
Static Rook openings
Fourth File Rook openings